Müslüm Yelken (born 28 November 1988) is a Turkish footballer who plays as a winger. He made his Süper Lig debut on 23 October 2011.

References

1988 births
Living people
People from Develi
Turkish footballers
Orduspor footballers
Süper Lig players
Association football midfielders
TFF First League players